Vasyl Zakharovych Borodai (18 August 1917–19 April 2010) was a Ukrainian sculptor, painter and parliamentary. He was known for his public monuments. Borodai was awarded the title, People's Painter of the USSR, and was academician of the Academy of Arts of the Soviet Union and Ukraine.

Biography 
Vasyl Zakharovych Borodai was born on 18 August 1917 in Yekaterinoslav (now Dnipro), Ukraine. He was a World War II veteran. While studying in Kyiv Arts Institute in 1947–1953, Borodai was a student of Ukrainian sculptor Mykhailo Lysenko.

Borodai's daughter was painter Halyna Vasylivna Borodai, and he was a guardian of another Ukrainian sculptor Alexander Kostetsky who early lost his father.

He died on 19 April 2010 in Kyiv.

Gallery

References

External links
 Vasyl Borodai in the Ukrainian Soviet Encyclopedia
 Tkachova, L.I. Borodai Vasyl Zakharovych (БОРОДАЙ ВАСИЛЬ ЗАХАРОВИЧ). Encyclopedia of History of Ukraine.

1917 births
2010 deaths
20th-century Ukrainian educators
20th-century Ukrainian sculptors
Artists from Dnipro
People from Yekaterinoslavsky Uyezd
Full Members of the Ukrainian Academy of Arts
Full Members of the USSR Academy of Arts
National Academy of Visual Arts and Architecture alumni
Academic staff of the National Academy of Visual Arts and Architecture
Ninth convocation members of the Verkhovna Rada of the Ukrainian Soviet Socialist Republic
Tenth convocation members of the Verkhovna Rada of the Ukrainian Soviet Socialist Republic
People's Artists of the USSR (visual arts)
Lenin Prize winners
Recipients of the Order of Bohdan Khmelnytsky, 3rd class
Recipients of the Order of Friendship of Peoples
Recipients of the Order of Lenin
Recipients of the Order of Merit (Ukraine), 3rd class
Recipients of the Order of Prince Yaroslav the Wise, 5th class
Recipients of the Order of the Red Banner of Labour
Recipients of the Order of the Red Star
Recipients of the Shevchenko National Prize
Ukrainian educational theorists
Ukrainian male sculptors
Ukrainian sculptors
Soviet educators
Soviet sculptors
Soviet military personnel of World War II
World War II spies for the Soviet Union
Burials at Baikove Cemetery
Ukrainian people of World War II